ISSC stands for the International Social Science Council, a non-governmental organization set up by the United Nations.

ISSC may also refer to:

Education
 Interdisciplinary School of Scientific Computing, at the University of Pune, India
 Instituto Salesiano Student Council, at the Instituto Salesiano, Macau

Business
 Isles of Scilly Steamship Company, a UK transportation company
 Integrated Systems Solution Corporation, an IBM computer services subsidiary, precursor of IBM Global Services
 ISSC Technologies, a Taiwan-based developer of Bluetooth system on chip solutions, acquired in 2014 cby Microchip Technology#ISSC Technologies

Others
 Irish Sporting and Social Club, an Irish/Gaelic social club located in Vancouver, Canada
 Interstate Shellfish Sanitation Conference, a US federal organization
 International Super Sportscar Circuit, at Rockingham Motor Speedway, UK
 The Informatics and Statistics Science Collaboration of the Large Synoptic Survey Telescope

See also
 ISCC (disambiguation)
 ISC (disambiguation)
 International Solid-State Circuits Conference (ISSCC)